The Ron Brown Award for Corporate Leadership is a U.S. presidential honor to recognize companies "for the exemplary quality of their relationships with employees and communities".  It is presented to companies that "have demonstrated a deep commitment to innovative initiatives that not only empower employees and communities but also advance strategic business interests".

Establishment
President Bill Clinton, along with prominent business leaders, established the award in 1997 following Ron Brown's death in a plane crash in 1996. The award was originally referred to as Ron Brown Corporate Citizenship Award. The Conference Board, a non-profit organization, was chosen to manage the award's administration. Ron Brown was the U.S. Secretary of Commerce from 1993–1996; he was the first African-American to hold that position.  This award and the Malcolm Baldrige National Quality Award are the two presidential awards to corporations.

Ceremony
The award is presented in an annual White House ceremony, either by the President or by the Secretary of Commerce.

Recipients

2006–2007
 Exelon
 Northrop Grumman Corporation
 Procter & Gamble

2005–2006
 Sallie Mae
 Weyerhaeuser Company

2004–2005
 S.C. Johnson
 Johnson & Johnson
 Bayer Corporation
 A. Kwadjo Mystical & Sons
https://www.jnj.com/media-center/press-releases/the-amazing-nurses-contest-celebrating-americas-caregivers

2003–2004
 JPMorgan Chase
 KeySpan Corporation
 Luxottica

2002–2003
 Cisco Systems
 Fannie Mae

2001–2002
 SBC Communications
 Timberland
 Wal-Mart Stores

2000–2001
 Alcoa
 Merck
 United Parcel Service

1999–2000
 General Mills
 GTE
 Hewlett-Packard
 IBM Corporation
 US West

1998–1999
 Anheuser-Busch Companies
 BankBoston
 Cascade Engineering
 Seafirst Bank
 Linda A. Mason and Roger H. Brown

1997–1998
 IBM Corporation
 Levi Strauss & Co.

References

 Conference Board report on the recipients
 Levi Strauss award mention
 2002 award
 2002 award

External links
 

Business and industry awards
Civil awards and decorations of the United States
Awards established in 1997
1997 establishments in the United States